Hans Neuendorf (born 1937) is a German entrepreneur and art dealer.

Biography

Neuendorf was born in 1937 and grew up during World War II. He started in the art business as a teenager, later hosting the first art pop exhibition in Germany. 

He founded Artnet, a database of art prices, which became the first art site to go online in 1989. In 2012, he handed over the role of chief executive of the business to his son, Jacob Pabst. Three off his sons and daughter Sophie are also involved in the company, serving as vice president. Neuendorf became involved in the industry when he traveled to France in the 1960s. Neuendorf has cited his favourite art as Cy Twombly. Artnet has also formed partnerships with Sothebys.

Its sister project Artnet Magazine was after (Slate) the second publication to go online.

Publications 

 Georg Baselitz: Ein neuer Typ (Bilder 1965–66). Text: Günther Gercken. Hamburg 1973.
 Jörg Immendorf: Teilbau. Texte: R. H. Fuchs und Johannes Gachnang. Hamburg 1981.
 Georg Baselitz: Zeichnungen 1961–1983. Texte: Günther Gercken und Franz Dahlem. Hamburg 1983.
 Christa Dichgans: Bilder 1981–1983. Text: A. R. Penck. Hamburg 1987.
 Lucio Fontana: 60 Werke aus den Jahren 1938–1960. Text: Katharina Hegewisch. Frankfurt/M. 1987.
 Leon Golub. Text: Janis Hendrickson. Ausstellungskatalog Frankfurt/M. 1987.
 Picabia 1879–1953. Texte: Timothey Clifford und Richard Calvocoressi. In collaboration with the National Gallery of Modern Art, Edinburgh. Frankfurt/M. 1988.
 Georg Baselitz: Adler. 53 Gouachen + Zeichnungen. Text: Günther Gercken. In collaboration with Galerie Buchmann. Frankfurt/M. 1988.
 Georg Baselitz: 100 Zeichnungen + Gouachen. Frankfurt/M. 1989.
 Emilio Vedova. Text: Katharina Hegewisch. Catalogue, Frankfurt/M. 1989.
 David Hockney: Neue Bilder. Text: Anders Stephenson. Catalogue, Frankfurt/M. 1989.
 Robert Graham: Statues. Text: John McEwen. Frankfurt/M. 1990.
 Richard Artschwager: Gemälde, Skulpturen, Zeichnungen, Multiples. Text: Catherine Kord. Catalogue, Frankfurt/M. 1990.
 Morris Louis. Ausstellungskatalog Frankfurt/M. 1991.
 Duane Hanson: Sculptures. Texte: Karl Ruhrberg und Eckart Britsch. Catalogue, Frankfurt/M. 1992.
 Georg Karl Pfahler. Texte: Gerd Winkler und Hans J. Müller. Catalogue, Frankfurt/M. 1992.
 Billy Al Bengston: Malerei als visuelles Tagebuch. Text: Karen Tsujimoto. Frankfurt/M. 1993.
 Bernd Koberling: Ausgewählte Bilder 1963–1989. Texte: Eckart Britsch und Günther Gercken, 1989.
 Bernd Koberling. Ausgewählte Bilder 1991–1993. Texte: Eckart Britsch und Günther Gercken, 1993.

References 

German art dealers
Living people
1937 births